Two ships of the Kaiserliche Marine were named Kronprinz Wilhelm:

 , an auxiliary cruiser
 , a battleship originally named 

German Navy ship names